Shiho refers to:

 Shihō, a series of ceremonies in Soto Zen Buddhism
 Shiho (given name)